The savanna glider (Petaurus ariel) is a species of arboreal gliding possum in the genus Petaurus.

Taxonomy 
It was long considered a subspecies of the sugar glider (P. breviceps), but a 2020 study split P. breviceps into 3 distinct species, with P. ariel being found to represent one of these distinct species.

Names 
The Bininj of western Arnhem Land, Australia call this animal lambalk in their Kunwinjku language.

Description 
The species somewhat resembles a small squirrel glider (P. norfolcensis) with a pointed nose. It displays substantial body size variation throughout its range; in the northern, more coastal portions, it is small enough to be considered the smallest of all Australian Petaurus. However, in the arid inland parts of its range to the south, it can grow to be twice as large.

Distribution 
The species lives in the wooded savannas of northern Australia. It ranges from northwestern Queensland west through the Northern Territory (including most of the Cobourg Peninsula) to northern Western Australia.

Reproduction 
In Arnhem Land, breeding is not seasonally restricted and young may be born throughout the year.

Threats 
The species is threatened by heavy declines that have been reported to have affected many other small, tree-dwelling mammal species in northern Australia. The species has undergone a 35% range reduction over the past 3 decades, and is disappearing from inland areas. These declines are thought to be linked to feral cats, changed fire regimes, and feral herbivores.

References 

Gliding possums
Marsupials of Australia
Mammals of Queensland
Mammals of the Northern Territory
Mammals of Western Australia
Mammals described in 1842